Phyllanthus arbuscula is a species of plant in the family Phyllanthaceae. It is endemic to Jamaica.

References

arbuscula
Near threatened plants
Endemic flora of Jamaica
Taxonomy articles created by Polbot